David Zeman (born 1942 in Czechoslovakia) is a former Association football defender.

Playing career

Club career
Zeman played for Sydney Prague FC and West Ryde.

International career
David was involved in Australia's second attempt for World Cup qualification, in 1969 when they narrowly missed out after a 1–1 draw with Israel in the final playoff.

Post-football career
Zeman lives nears Coffs Harbour. Though he is retired from full-time work, he works as an art teacher with the Woolgoolga Art Group.

References

1942 births
Australian soccer players
Australia international soccer players
Australian people of Czech descent
Czechoslovak emigrants to Australia
Living people
Association football defenders
Sydney FC Prague players